The Upemba lechwe (Kobus leche anselli) is a subspecies of antelope found only in the Upemba wetlands in the Democratic Republic of Congo. It was described in 2005, after analysis of 35 museum specimens collected in 1926 and 1947–8. Some authorities treat the Upemba lechwe as a species, K. anselli.

The population of Upemba lechwe has declined greatly since the 1970s. Commercial poaching during the 1980s reduced the population from an estimated 20,000 individuals to under 1,000 today. The recognition of K. anselli as a distinct evolutionary entity was previously ignored, because originally thought to be simply a red lechwe. The future of the Upemba lechwe hinges on reducing adverse human impact and maintaining the integrity of its wetland habitat.

Lechwe stand 90 to 100 cm (35 to 39 in) at the shoulder and weigh from 70 to 120 kg (150 to 260 lb). They are golden brown with white bellies. Males are darker in color. The long, spiral horns are vaguely lyre-shaped and borne only by males. The hind legs are somewhat longer in proportion than in other antelopes to ease long-distance running on marshy soil.

References

External links
 The Upemba lechwe, Kobus anselli: an antelope new to science emphasizes the conservation importance of Katanga, Democratic Republic of Congo (abstract)

Marsh antelopes
Mammals of the Democratic Republic of the Congo
Endemic fauna of the Democratic Republic of the Congo
Upemba lechwe